Accept is the fourth studio album by the blues band, Chicken Shack, released in 1970.  Accept was Chicken Shack's last album on the Blue Horizon label.  This album was also the last for Andy Sylvester, Dave Bidwell and Paul Raymond as members of Chicken Shack. It also marks a departure from pure blues to a more progressive and psychedelic sound.

The entire album and the rest of the Chicken Shack sessions on Blue Horizon were made available on the CD compilation Chicken Shack - The Complete Blue Horizon Sessions (2007).

Track listing
All songs written and composed by Stan Webb and Paul Raymond.

Side one
 "Diary of Your Life"
 "Pocket"*
 "Never Ever"*
 "Sad Clown"*
 "Maudie"*
 "Telling Your Fortune"

Side two
 "Tired Eyes"
 "Some Other Time"*
 "Going Round"
 "Andalucian Blues"
 "You Knew You Did You Did"
 "She Didn't Use Her Loaf"

Personnel

Chicken Shack
Stan Webb – guitar, vocals
Paul Raymond – keyboards, vocals
Andy Sylvester – bass guitar
Dave Bidwell – drums

Production
 Producer – Mike Vernon
 Engineer – Mike Ross
 Studio – CBS
 Photography and design – Terence Ibbott

Trivia 
The album title inspired the German heavy metal band Accept to change its name from Band X to Accept.

References

1970 albums
Chicken Shack albums
Blue Horizon Records albums
Albums produced by Mike Vernon (record producer)